Duan Yongping (born 1961) is a Chinese billionaire entrepreneur and electrical engineer. He is the founder of both the Subor Electronics Industry Corporation (also the former CEO), and BBK Electronics Group (also the current Chairman). Duan's net worth was estimated at $1.5 billion, according to the 2018 Hurun China Rich List.

Early life and education
Born on 10 March 1961 in Nanchang, Jiangxi, China, Duan entered Zhejiang University in 1978, majoring in wireless electronics engineering. After graduation, he became a teacher at the adult education center of the Beijing Radio Tube Factory (now BOE Technology). Later, he studied at Renmin University, where he majored in econometrics. He also studied in CEIBS as an EMBA student for two years.

Career
In 1989, he joined a company in Zhongshan and became the CEO later. Within less than 6 years, he created a business empire with the brand Subor (Xiao Ba Wang). In 1995, he left Subor and founded BBK Electronics.

Duan was one of the founders and former CEO (1989-1995 in office) of Subor Electronics Industry Corporation. At the beginning, the company only had 20 workers including himself. They only had 3000 RMB cash but owed 2 million RMB debts. But after Duan's struggle, it quickly became top producer of the "learning computer". It also produced video-game facilities, which made a profit of more than 200 million RMB during 1994–1995.

Founding of BBK
On 28 August 1995, Duan resigned from Subor, and founded BBK Electronics Industrial Group in Dongguan, Guangdong Province. Its main product was DVD players.  It is a well-known brand in cell phone, telephone and stereo devices.

From 2002 to 2004, he was the second largest individual shareholder (with more than 10% at peak) of NetEase after William Ding Lei.

Personal life and philanthropy
Together with William Ding Lei, Duan donated  to Zhejiang University in September 2006. This is the biggest endowment in recent years for higher education in mainland China.

In 2007, Duan spent US$620,100 to have lunch with Warren Buffett ("Power Lunch with Warren Buffett"), the money was donated to the Glide Foundation. Due to his success in the stock market, and philanthropic activities, he has been called the "Chinese Buffett".

Duan founded the Enlight Foundation in 2004. It is run by his spouse Xin Liu, who is also the director and co-founder of Xinhe Foundation (previously Xinping Foundation) in China. Xin is an award-winning photojournalist and has worked for China Youth Daily, Baltimore Sun, Miami Herald, Pittsburgh Post-Gazette, and Palm Beach Post.  Xin later freelanced in China for Time Magazine, Newsweek, Fortune Magazine, Yazhou Zhoukan, among others.

References

1961 births
Living people
Chinese billionaires
Businesspeople from Jiangxi
Zhejiang University alumni
Renmin University of China alumni
People from Nanchang
Businesspeople in electronics
OnePlus people
Chinese technology company founders